Waqa Blake (born 26 October 1994) is a Fijian professional rugby league footballer who plays as a  and  for the Parramatta Eels in the NRL and Fiji at international level.

He previously played for the Penrith Panthers in the National Rugby League and New South Wales City.

Background
Blake was born in Lautoka, Fiji, and is of Fijian descent through his mother. Blake moved to Sydney, New South Wales, Australia as a 9-year-old.

He played his junior football for the Brighton Seagulls. Blake then moved to Perth and played for Joondalup Giants in the Perth Rugby League competition before making the Perth Pirates S. G. Ball Cup representative team. At the end of 2012, after being spotted playing for the Pirates, Blake was signed by the Penrith Panthers.

Playing career

2013
In 2013 and 2014, Blake played for the Penrith Panthers' NYC team. Blake played in the Penrith club's 2013 NYC Grand Final against the New Zealand Warriors at centre, scoring a try in Penrith's 42-30 win.

2014
In May 2014, Blake was named on the interchange bench for the Fiji international team for the Pacific Rugby League International test against Samoa but was later replaced by Petero Civoniceva.

In the second half of the 2014 season, Blake moved on to Penrith's  New South Wales Cup team, later earning selection in the New South Wales Residents team at centre in the 24-16 loss against Queensland Residents at Suncorp Stadium.

On 28 September 2014, Blake played at centre in Penrith's 2014 New South Wales Cup Grand Final against the Newcastle Knights and scored a try in the club's 48-12 win. On 5 October 2014, Blake scored a try in the Penrith club's 32-28 defeat by the Northern Pride in the 2014 NRL State Championship.

2015
On 26 February 2015, Blake extended his contract with Penrith from the end of 2016 to the end of 2017. In Round 5 of the 2015 NRL season, Blake made his NRL debut for the Penrith Panthers against the North Queensland Cowboys at centre in Penrith's 30-10 loss at Penrith Stadium. In Blake's next match in Round 6 against the Manly-Warringah Sea Eagles, Blake scored his first NRL career try in the Penrith club's 22-12 win at Penrith Stadium. On 3 May 2015, Blake played for New South Wales City against New South Wales Country, playing at centre in City's 34-22 loss. He finished off his debut year in the NRL having played in 18 matches and scoring 5 tries for the Panthers.

2016
In February 2016, Blake was named in Penrith's 2016 NRL Auckland Nines squad. After New Zealand international representatives and usual backline starters Peta Hiku and Dean Whare suffered season ending knee injuries, Blake made the right centre position of his own, having some blockbusting performances in the late rounds of the season during the Panthers charge into the finals, a great transformation after he explained that he returned to pre-season training 12 kilograms overweight and coach Anthony Griffin mentioning to him that "if you want to play in the outside backs, you need to trim down, otherwise you’ll be playing in the forwards". Blake enjoyed his 2016 NRL season with him playing with playing in 21 matches and scoring 8 tries for the Penrith club. On 14 November 2016, Blake extended his contract with Penrith to the end of the 2019 NRL season.

2017
In February 2017, Blake was named in Penrith's runners-up 2017 NRL Auckland Nines squad where he was named in the Team of the Tournament. After the Penrith club's Round 5 clash against the Melbourne Storm, where they lost 28-6 at AAMI Park, Blake alongside Panthers captain Matt Moylan and Peta Hiku were dropped to Penrith's NSW Cup team for 1 match after they breached the booze curfew by being out in the Melbourne nightlife into the early hours of the next morning. On 6 May 2017, Blake made his international debut for Fiji against Tonga, playing at centre in the 26-24 loss at Campbelltown Stadium. In Round 26 against the Manly-Warringah Sea Eagles, Blake suffered a season-ending shoulder injury during the Panthers 28-12 loss at Brookvale Oval, unfortunately resulting him of missing the finals series and representing Fiji for the 2017 Rugby League World Cup. Blake finished the 2017 NRL season with him playing in 23 matches and scoring 7 tries for the Panthers.

2018
In Round 1 against cross-city rivals, the Parramatta Eels, Blake started the 2018 season with a bang, scoring two tries for Penrith as they came back from a 14-0 deficit to achieve a 24-14 victory at Penrith Stadium. As Blake showed great form in the early rounds, unfortunately in Round 5 against the Parramatta Eels, who the Penrith clubplayed against a month earlier, Blake suffered a high-grade syndesmosis injury in his right ankle in late in second-half as the Panthers walked away with a close 12-6 win at ANZ Stadium. Blake was set to miss four rounds but unfortunately was ruled out for longer. Blake finally made his return for Penrith in Round 17 against the New Zealand Warriors, scoring a try in the 36-4 upset win at Penrith Stadium. Blake finished the 2018 NRL season with him being Penrith's highest tryscorer with 12 tries in 15 matches.

2019
Blake started the 2019 NRL season as one of Penrith's first choice centres.  Blake would play the first 10 games of the season for Penrith as the club struggled on the field winning only 2 of their first 9 matches which left the side last on the table.  Blake's final game for Penrith was in Round 11 against Parramatta at the new Western Sydney Stadium which Penrith won 16-10.  The following week, it was revealed that Blake would be ruled out for 10 weeks with a knee injury.  On 26 June, it was announced that Blake was released by Penrith and had signed a four-and-a-half year deal with Parramatta.

Blake made his debut for Parramatta against the New Zealand Warriors which ended in a 24-22 victory at the new Western Sydney Stadium.

In Round 22 against the Gold Coast, Blake scored his first and second tries for Parramatta in a 36-12 victory at Cbus Super Stadium.

2020
In round 5 of the 2020 NRL season, Blake scored a try and had one try assist as Parramatta defeated his former club Penrith 16-10.  The result saw Parramatta win their first five games of the year, the club's best start to a season since 1986.

Blake played a total of 22 games for Parramatta in the 2020 NRL season as the club finished third but were eliminated in straight sets from the finals.  Blake came under intense criticism in the second half of the season after numerous poor defensive displays.

2021
In round 1 of the 2021 NRL season, Blake was injured in Parramatta's 24-16 victory over Brisbane and ruled out for an indefinite period.

Blake returned to the Parramatta starting side for their round 10 victory over the New Zealand Warriors.  The following week, Blake was badly exposed in defence during Parramatta's 28-6 loss against Manly-Warringah.  Blake missed six tackles throughout the game, gave away four penalties and was sin binned in the 72nd minute.

Blake made a total of 17 appearances for Parramatta in the 2021 NRL season including the club's two finals matches against Newcastle and Penrith.

2022
In round 4 of the 2022 NRL season, Blake scored two tries for Parramatta in a 48-14 victory over St. George.
In round 5 of the 2022 NRL season, Blake was taken from the field during the clubs 26-20 victory over the Gold Coast.  It was later announced that Blake would be ruled out from playing indefinitely with a knee injury.
In round 18, Blake scored two tries for Parramatta in a 28-18 victory over the New Zealand Warriors.
In round 23, Blake scored two tries for Parramatta in a 42-6 victory over arch-rivals Canterbury.
Blake played a total of 22 games for Parramatta throughout the year including all three of the clubs finals matches and the 2022 NRL Grand Final loss to Penrith.

References

External links

Parramatta Eels profile
Penrith Panthers profile

1994 births
Living people
Fiji national rugby league team players
Fijian emigrants to Australia
Fijian people of British descent
Fijian people of Tongan descent
Fijian rugby league players
I-Taukei Fijian people
New South Wales City Origin rugby league team players
Parramatta Eels players
Penrith Panthers players
Rugby league centres
Rugby league wingers
Sportspeople from Lautoka